The 2019 Santosh Trophy qualifiers was the qualifying round for the 73rd edition of the Santosh Trophy, the premier competition in India for teams representing their regional and state football associations.

East Zone
The East Zone matches of the Santosh Trophy qualifiers started on 2 February 2019 in Bhilai, Chhattisgarh.

Group A

Group B

South Zone
The South Zone matches of the Santosh Trophy qualifiers started on 3 February 2019 in Neyveli, Tamil Nadu.

Group A

Group B

West Zone
The West Zone matches of the Santosh Trophy qualifiers started on 7 February 2019 in Solapur, Maharashtra.

Group A

Group B

North Zone
The North Zone matches of the Santosh Trophy qualifiers started on 11 February 2019 in Katra, Jammu and Kashmir.

Group A

Group B

North-East Zone
The North-East Zone matches of the Santosh Trophy qualifiers started on 11 February 2019 in Aizawl, Mizoram.

In Group B, Nagaland withdrew just before the qualifiers after they failed to register players in Centralised Registration System.

Group A

Group B

Goalscorers

6 Goals 
 Pavan Ramanuj (Gujarat)

4 Goals
 Sanket Salokhe (Maharashtra) 
 Aditya Jha (Gujarat)
 Musamiyan Syed (Gujarat)

3 Goals
 Joaquim Abranches (Goa) 
 Arif Shaikh (Maharashtra) 
 Arbin Lakra (Odisha)

2 Goals
 Bishnu Bordoloi (Assam)
 Ravinder Singh (Chandigarh) 
 Somnath (Chhattisgarh) 
 Lalawmpuia (Goa) 
 Baldhir Tigga (Madhya Pradesh) 
 Lineker Machado (Maharashtra) 
 Mrunal Tandel (Maharashtra) 
 Rohan Shukla (Maharashtra) 
 Donald Diengdoh (Meghalaya) 
 Ramhlunchhunga (Mizoram) 
 Arjun Nayak (Odisha) 
 Jaspreet Singh (Punjab) 
 Himanshu Rao (Rajasthan)

1 Goal
 G.Manjunath (Andhra Pradesh) 
 Tarh Dolu (Arunachal Pradesh) 
 Akrang Narzary (Assam)
 Milan Basumatary (Assam) 
 Arif Khan (Bihar) 
 Amit Kumar (Chandigarh) 
 Gaurav Negi (Chandigarh) 
 Kuldip Vatra (Dadra & Nagar Haveli) 
 Ayush Adhikari (Delhi) 
 Kushant Chauhan (Delhi) 
 Nitesh Chikara (Delhi) 
 Tushar Chaudhary (Delhi) 
 Arjun Chaudhary (Gujarat) 
 Nitin Singh (Gujarat) 
 Parveen Dhull (Haryana) 
 Bhemant (Himachal Pradesh) 
 Mohit (Himachal Pradesh) 
 Mukesh (Himachal Pradesh) 
 Nikhil (Himachal Pradesh) 
 Aakif Javed (Jammu & Kashmir) 
 Asif Ashraf (Jammu & Kashmir) 
 Goutam Mehra (Jammu & Kashmir) 
 Shakir Ahmad (Jammu & Kashmir) 
 Krishnakant Prapat (Jharkhand) 
 Shamim Hussain (Jharkhand) 
 A. S. Ashik (Karnataka) 
 Leon Augustine (Karnataka) 
 Manvir Singh (Karnataka) 
 Nikhil Raj (Karnataka) 
 P. P. Shafeel (Karnataka) 
 Sunil Kumar (Karnataka) 
 Akash Bharbar (Madhya Pradesh) 
 Dhruwesh Nijap (Maharashtra) 
 Vinodkumar Pandey (Maharashtra) 
 Ginminthang Hangsing (Manipur) 
 Wahengbam Angousana Lupang (Manipur) 
 Brolington Warlarpih (Meghalaya)
 MC Malsawmzuala (Mizoram) 
 Harpal Singh (Punjab) 
 Paramjit Singh (Punjab) 
 Sukhpreet Singh (Punjab) 
 Karandev (Rajasthan) 
 Vishal Goutam (Rajasthan) 
 Hari Krishna (Services) 
 N. Herojit Singh (Services) 
 Mohammed Danish (Services) 
 Vikas Thapa (Services) 
 Ashish Chettri (Sikkim) 
 Bibek Bhutia (Sikkim) 
 Kunal Tamang (Sikkim) 
 Sanjay Rai (Sikkim) 
 Sonam Bhutia (Sikkim) 
 N. Solaimalai (Tamil Nadu) 
 T. Vijay (Tamil Nadu) 
 Shaun Campbell (Telangana) 
 Shafique Mohammed (Telangana) 
 Chirag Negi (Uttarakhand) 
 Vishal Nagarkoti (Uttarakhand) 
 Ankur Kumar Sharma (Uttar Pradesh) 
 Arijeet Singh (West Bengal) 
 Hira Mondal (West Bengal)

Notable players

References

External links
 Santosh Trophy on the All India Football Federation website .

2018–19 Santosh Trophy